Ardameh (also Romanized as Ārdameh) is a village in Torqabeh Rural District, Torqabeh District, Torqabeh and Shandiz County, Razavi Khorasan Province, Iran. At the 2006 census, its population was 152, in 54 families.

See also 

 List of cities, towns and villages in Razavi Khorasan Province

References 

Populated places in Torqabeh and Shandiz County